Sakho is a surname of Senegalese origin. Notable people with the surname include:

Diafra Sakho, Senegalese footballer
Diogal Sakho, Senegalese musician
Jordan Sakho, Congolese basketball player
Lamine Sakho, Senegalese footballer
Mamadou Sakho, French footballer
Mamadou Sakho (wrestler), Senegalese wrestler
Mohamed Sakho, Guinean footballer
Sandro Sakho, Portuguese footballer

Senegalese surnames